Leee Black Childers (July 24, 1945 – April 6, 2014) was an American photographer, writer and rock music manager, who "recorded the legacy of a theatrical cross over between rock music and gay culture". Born Lee Black Childers in Jefferson County, Kentucky, he started to spell his name with three rather than two "e"s as a child.

Biography
Childers grew up in Kentucky and attended Kentucky Southern College near Louisville, Kentucky, before moving to San Francisco, and later in 1968 to New York City.

He began taking photographs of drag queens and was encouraged by Andy Warhol to work as a photographer, gaining a reputation for his portraits of the artists, musicians and others who passed through the Factory in New York. In the early 1970s, he managed Warhol's stage production, Pork, directed by Tony Ingrassia at the Roundhouse in London. He was assistant to Warhol at the Factory between 1982 and 1984, and took photographs of visiting celebrities, counter-cultural figures and musicians, particularly of punk rock and new wave music stars, such as Ruby Lynn Reyner, Debbie Harry, Jayne County and the Sex Pistols. He worked as a tour manager for David Bowie, Iggy Pop, Johnny Thunders and Mott the Hoople among others.

In 2012 he published Drag Queens, Rent Boys, Pick Pockets, Junkies, Rockstars and Punks, a collection of some of his photographs and their background which was the subject of exhibitions in London in 2011 and Los Angeles, California, in March 2014.

In 2016, Childers's 2010 interview was featured in Danny Says appearing alongside Danny Fields, Iggy Pop and Alice Cooper.

Childers died in Los Angeles, California, on April 6, 2014, at the age of 68 from undisclosed causes.

References

External links
Video interview

1945 births
2014 deaths
Rock music photographers
Andy Warhol
Artists from Louisville, Kentucky
Writers from Louisville, Kentucky
American LGBT photographers